The 1880 AAA Championships was an outdoor track and field competition organised by the Amateur Athletic Association (AAA), held on Saturday 3 July at Lillie Bridge Grounds, London, England. It was the first championships organised by the AAA, and it replaced championships held by the Amateur Athletic Club since 1866. Representatives of the Amateur Athletic Club handed over to the new association the challenge cups that had been competed for at their championship for presentation at the new competition. The prizes were presented by Lady Jersey, wife of the Earl of Jersey.

The fourteen events on the programme were for men only, with heats and finals all held on the same day, with the exception of the 10 miles race, which was held on the following Thursday, 7 July, at the same venue. The track was one-third of a mile (586 yards 2 feet) in circumference with one long straight and three bends. There were no heats in the field events, some of which had only two or three competitors. It was customary at the time for race winners only to have their performances recorded, therefore, in the tables below other competitors are shown with the distance each man was behind the man in front. Field event performances are shown in feet and inches as they were originally measured, with a conversion to metric measurement in parentheses. Conversions have been obtained using the International Metric Conversion Tables published by the International Amateur Athletics Federation in 1970.

It had rained heavily during the morning and by three o'clock, when the first event was due to start, the track was waterlogged and the grass, where the hurdles were set up, was slippery. For the one mile there were only two entries, but Samuel Holman (London AC) did not start and Walter George (Moseley Harriers) ran alone in the outside lane to avoid the water. The times for his three laps were as follows: 1:21.4, 2:54.0 (1:32.6), 4:28.0 (1:34.0).

There were two heats in the 440 yards, with the first two in each heat qualifying for the final. In heat two there was a dead heat for second place and all three were advanced to the final. The winner of the final was Montague Shearman, the honorary secretary of the organising committee.

William Hough (Cambridge Un. AC) had won the 3 miles at the Cambridge Sports and set a new meet record of 15:01 1/5 in the match against Oxford University and was thought to be the favourite to win the 4 miles. There were eight starters, only five of whom finished the race. James Concannon (Widnes AC), the winner of the steeplechase, led for the first lap, but was soon overtaken and dropped out after one mile. The lead was taken over by P. H. Stenning (London AC) who took them through the first mile (3 laps) in 4:56 with Hough in second place and Walter George (Moseley H.), who had started quite slowly, moved up into fourth place. Hough and Stenning then alternated the lead as George moved up into third place. Stenning led at two miles (10:22) but shortly after George took the lead and Stenning dropped out leaving Hough in second place. A. H. Davis (Blackheath H.) was eighty yards away in third and close behind him was A. S. Suffell (Clapton Beagles). At three miles, passed in 15:39, George was slightly ahead of Hough, who then dashed into the lead and tried to open up a gap, but George caught him within a lap and Hough stopped by the pavillion and retired leaving George a long way ahead of Davis and Suffell. They finished in that order with W. Johnson almost a whole lap behind.

William Winthrop's performance in the shot put was a world amateur record. He held the record for one year until it was beaten in this championship in 1881, and he remains the only Englishman ever to hold the world record in this event.

Results summary

Notes: no heats, 5 competitors only

Notes: 2 heats, Lynch 51 3/5sec.; Phillips 51 sec.

Notes: only one competitor

Notes: only 5 finished

Notes: Distance was 1 mile 1,440 yards (2,912 metres)

Notes: 2 heats

Notes: only 3 competitors

Notes: only 3 competitors

Notes: only 5 competitors

Notes: only 1 competitor

Notes: only 2 competitors

Notes: only 4 finishers. Harry Webster (Stoke AC) finished first in 53:50 but was disqualified.

External links 
National Union of Track Statisticians

References 

AAA Championships
Athletics Outdoor
1880 in English sport
1880 sports events in London
Sports competitions in London
Athletics competitions in England